Rubus coronarius (common name roseleaf raspberry) is an Asian species of flowering plant in the rose family. It is native to the Indian Subcontinent, Malaysia, and Indonesia, and naturalized in southern China and the West Indies.

The genetics of Rubus is extremely complex, so that it is difficult to decide on which groups should be recognized as species. There are many rare species with limited ranges such as this. Further study is suggested to clarify the taxonomy.

References

External links
花卉图片网  重瓣蔷薇莓 Rubus rosaefolius var. coronarius photos with captions in Chinese

coronarius
Plants described in 1815
Flora of Asia